The following is a list of the highest-income urban areas in the United States. The U.S. Census Bureau defines two types of urban areas. They are listed below, along with their Census definitions.

 Urbanized Area (UA), an area consisting of a central place(s) and adjacent territory with a general population density of at least 1,000 people per square mile of land area that together have a minimum residential population of at least 50,000 people. The Census Bureau uses published criteria to determine the qualification and boundaries of UAs.
 Urban Cluster (UC), a densely settled territory that has at least 2,500 people but fewer than 50,000.

Urban areas ranked by per capita income

Urban areas of any population

Urban areas with at least 100,000 inhabitants

Sources
Statistics derived from U.S. Census Bureau data; U.S. Department of Commerce, Bureau of Economic Analysis, Survey of Current Business; and DataQuick Information Systems, a public records database company located in La Jolla, San Diego, CA.

References

United States demography-related lists
Income in the United States